Bogande is a department or commune of Gnagna Province in northern Burkina Faso. Its capital is the town of Bogande.

Demographics 
The population of Bogandé is approximately 335,571 inhabitants in 2013. The population density is 52.2 inhabitants per square kilometer. The literacy rate is around 60%. The major ethnic groups include Gourmantché, Mossi, Fulani, Bellas, Hausa

Economy 
The primary economic activity in the region is subsistence agriculture.

Geography 
The area is mostly a flat savanna with low shrubby trees.

Climate 
The average rainfall was 622.9 mm of water in 2011.

Transport 
The local road network is in poor condition. Heavy rains can make local roads nearly impassable, poisoning a serious problem for the inhabitants.

Towns and villages
Towns and villages include Dapili, Ouapassi and Thierry.

References

Departments of Burkina Faso
Gnagna Province